Runoff voting can refer to:
 Two-round system, a voting system used to elect a single winner, whereby only two candidates from the first round continue to the second round, where one candidate will win.
 Instant-runoff voting, an electoral system whereby voters rank the candidates in order of preference.
 Contingent vote, an instant-runoff (preferential, single round) version of the two-round system.
 Exhaustive ballot, a reiterative voting system, whereby rounds of voting continue (with or without elimination) until one candidate achieves a majority, also called repeated balloting.